Stylonuroides is a genus of prehistoric eurypterid. The genus is classified as a stylonurine but more precise classification has proven difficult, with the genus remaining classified as incertae sedis within the suborder. The genus contains two species, S. dolichopteroides from the Silurian of Ringerike, Norway and S. orientalis from the Devonian of Lake Shunet, Southern Siberia.

Description 
The compound eyes of Stylonuroides are comparatively large, though their exact shape is unclear due to poor preservation. The posterior margin of the eyes lie in the middle of the prosoma. Stylonuroides orientalis is smaller in size than S. dolichopteroides, with a prosoma measuring about 12 mm. S. orientalis differs from S. dolichopteroides in a number of features, including that it preserves processes on the genal angles, a slightly convex posterior margin of the prosoma and slightly more widely set compound eyes.

S. orientalis is based on a single specimen, PIN 1220/1 (consisting of parts of a prosoma and five anterior segments of the opisthosoma), which can be placed in the genus based on a combination of features, including its strongly elongated parabolic prosoma, large compound eyes and the broad marginal rim of the prosoma.

Species 
Stylonuroides contains two valid species, with other named species now seen as invalid.
 Stylonuroides orientalis Shpinev, 2012  - Siberia, Russia (Devonian)
 Stylonuroides dolichopteroides Størmer, 1934 - Ringerike, Norway (Silurian)
Invalid or reassigned species are listed below:
 Stylonuroides limbatus Clarke & Rudemann, 1912 - New York, United States (Ordovician), a pseudofossil.

References 

Stylonurina
Silurian eurypterids
Fossils of Norway
Eurypterids of Europe
Devonian eurypterids
Eurypterids of Asia